Brown-Vialetto-Van-Laere syndrome (BVVL), sometimes known as Brown's Syndrome, is a rare degenerative disorder often initially characterized by progressive sensorineural deafness.

The syndrome most often affects children, adolescents, and young adults. As knowledge of BVVL grows some adult patients have now been diagnosed. With prompt treatment the prognosis may be positive with some patients stabilizing and even major improvements noted in certain cases.

Symptoms and signs

BVVL is marked by a number of cranial nerve palsies, including those of the motor components involving the 7th and 9th-12th cranial nerves, spinal motor nerves, and upper motor neurons. Major features of BVVL include facial and neck weakness, fasciculation of the tongue, and neurological disorders from the cranial nerves.  The neurological manifestations develop insidiously: they usually begin with sensorineural deafness, progress inexorably to paralysis, and often culminate in respiratory failure. Most mortality in patients has been from either respiratory infections or respiratory muscle paralysis.  Pathological descriptions of BVVL include injury and depletion of 3rd-7th cranial nerves, loss of the spinal anterior horn cells, degeneration of Purkinje cells, as well as degeneration of the spinocerebellar and pyramidal tracts.  The first symptoms in nearly all cases of BVVL is progressive vision loss and deafness, and the first initial symptoms are seen anywhere from one to three years.

Most cases of deafness are followed by a latent period that can extend anywhere from weeks to years, and this time is usually marked by cranial nerve degeneration.  Neurological symptoms of BVVL include optic atrophy, cerebellar ataxia, retinitis pigmentosa, epilepsy and autonomic dysfunction. Non-neurological symptoms can include diabetes, auditory hallucinations, respiratory difficulties, color blindness, and hypertension.

Genetics

The disorder has been associated with various mutations in the SLC52A2 and SLC52A3 genes. This gene is thought to be involved in transport of riboflavin.

BVVL is allelic and phenotypically similar to Fazio–Londe disease and likewise is inherited in an autosomal recessive manner.

Diagnosis
Diagnosis requires a neurological examination and neuroimaging can be helpful.

BVVL can be differentially diagnosed from similar conditions like Fazio-Londe syndrome and amyotrophic lateral sclerosis, in that those two conditions don't involve sensorineural hearing loss, while BVVL, Madras motor neuron disease, Nathalie syndrome, and Boltshauser syndrome do.  Nathalie syndrome does not involve lower cranial nerve symptoms, so it can be excluded if those are present.  If there is evidence of lower motor neuron involvement, Boltshauser syndrome can be excluded.   Finally, if there is a family history of the condition, then BVVL is more likely than MMND, as MMND tends to be sporadic.

Genetic testing is able to identify genetic mutations underlying BVVL.

Treatment
As of 2017, there were case reports that treatment with high doses of riboflavin 5 phosphate can halt the progress of Brown–Vialetto–Van Laere syndrome and in some cases can improve symptoms.

The first report of BVVL syndrome in Japanese literature was of a woman that had BVVL and showed improvement after such treatments.  The patient was a sixty-year-old woman who had symptoms such as sensorineural deafness, weakness, and atrophy since she was 15 years old.  Around the age of 49 the patient was officially diagnosed with BVVL, intubated, and then attached to a respirator to improve her  CO₂ narcosis.  After the treatments, the patient still required respiratory assistance during sleep; however, the patient no longer needed assistance by a respirator during the daytime.

Prognosis
The clinical course of BVVL can vary from one patient to another.  There have been cases with progressive deterioration, deterioration followed by periods of stabilization, and deterioration with abrupt periods of increasing severity.

The syndrome has previously been considered to have a high mortality rate but the initial response of most patients to the Riboflavin protocol are very encouraging and seem to indicate a significantly improved life expectancy could be achievable. There are three documented cases of BVVL where the patient died within the first five years of the disease.  On the contrary, most patients have survived more than 10 years after the onset of their first symptom, and several cases have survived 20–30 years after the onset of their first symptom.

Families with multiple cases of BVVL and, more generally, multiple cases of infantile progressive bulbar palsy can show variability in age of disease onset and survival. Dipti and Childs described such a situation in which a family had five children that had Infantile PBP.  In this family, three siblings showed sensorineural deafness and other symptoms of BVVL at an older age.  The other two siblings showed symptoms of Fazio-Londe disease and died before the age of two.

Epidemiology
As of 2015, there are approximately 70 known cases of Brown-Vialetto-Van-Laere syndrome worldwide. BVVL was first described in a Portuguese family, and has since been described in a number of ethnic groups.  Reports have shown that BVVL infects females more than males at a rate of 5:1 respectively.  However, males usually exhibit more severe symptoms, an earlier onset of deafness and a tendency to die earlier in life.

History
The syndrome was first described by Charles Brown in 1894; further accounts by Vialetto and Van Laere followed in 1936 and 1966, respectively. There were very few cases reported in the medical literature over the 100 odd years since its first description however with the specific genetic testing available in recent years more cases are being identified and treated.

See also
 Fazio–Londe disease

References

Further reading

External links 

Neurological disorders
Syndromes affecting the nervous system
Syndromes affecting hearing
Rare syndromes